Tandoğan is a Turkish surname. Notable people with the surname include:

 Ali Tandoğan, Turkish footballer
 Aslı Tandoğan, Turkish actress
 Barış Tandoğan (born 1997), Turkish archer
 Nevzat Tandoğan (1894–1946), Turkish politician 

Turkish-language surnames